Wood pewee or peewee may refer to the following species formerly considered to be a single species:

 Eastern wood pewee, Contopus virens
 Western wood pewee, Contopus sordidulus

Birds by common name